Żelechów is a town in Garwolin County, Masovian Voivodeship (east-central Poland).

Żelechów may also refer to:
Żelechów, Grodzisk Mazowiecki County in Masovian Voivodeship (east-central Poland)
Żelechów, Grójec County in Masovian Voivodeship (east-central Poland)
Żelechów, Lubusz Voivodeship (west Poland)